Clive Haywood (born 1 November 1960 in Ramsgate, Kent) is an English former footballer who played in the Football League for Coventry City, for Seiko and Bulova SA in Hong Kong, in the North American Soccer League for the Washington Diplomats, and in non-League football for Thanet United.

Football career
In 1975, Haywood signed on schoolboy forms with Coventry City.  During the 1978–79 season, he was the top scorer for the Coventry City reserve team ahead of Mark Hateley, Garry Thompson and Gary Bannister.  The following season, he had 9 goals in 24 matches. And then, he was sent on a 3-month loan along with Steve Whitton to Seiko FC in Hong Kong.  After returning from Hong Kong, Haywood made his professional debut in England on 30 August 1980 against Aston Villa, but this turned out to be his only first team appearance.  In 1981, Haywood was sold to Washington Diplomats in the NASL where he played alongside Johan Cruyff.

A year later, he was sold to Bulova SA in Hong Kong.  His teammates included Arsenal's Charlie George and Tommy Hutchison. He was the top scorer in the Hong Kong league for the 1982–83 season with 26 goals.  He returned to England in 1984 with Thanet United. He retired in 1986.

References

1960 births
Living people
Bulova SA players
English footballers
English expatriate footballers
Coventry City F.C. players
Margate F.C. players
North American Soccer League (1968–1984) players
Seiko SA players
Expatriate footballers in Hong Kong
Washington Diplomats (NASL) players
Deal Town F.C. players
Association football forwards
English expatriate sportspeople in the United States
Expatriate soccer players in the United States